Club de Rugby Sant Cugat is a Spanish rugby team based in Sant Cugat del Vallès.

History
The club was founded in 1987.

References

External links
Club de Rugby Sant Cugat

Sant Cugat del Vallès
Sant C
Rugby clubs established in 1987
1987 establishments in Catalonia